The Hunter 20 is an American trailerable sailboat that was designed by Cortland Steck as daysailer and small cruiser and first built in 1983.

Production
The design was built by Hunter Marine in the United States between 1983-1984, but it is now out of production.

Design
The Hunter 20 is a recreational keelboat, built predominantly of fiberglass, with wood trim. It has a fractional sloop rig, a raked stem, a vertical transom, a transom-hung rudder controlled by a tiller, a "pop-up" companionway hatch and a retractable centerboard. It displaces  and carries  of ballast.

Standard equipment includes a stove and cooler, toilet, life jackets and an anchor.

The design has sleeping accommodation for five people, with a double "V"-berth in the bow cabin, a straight settee in the main cabin and a dinette table that drops down to form a double berth on the starboard side. The galley slides under the cockpit when not in use.

The boat is normally fitted with a small  outboard motor for docking and maneuvering.

The design has a PHRF racing average handicap of 282 with a high of 274 and low of 288.

Operational history
In a 2010 review Steve Henkel wrote, "best features: Compared to her comp[etitor]s, the Hunter 20 is small. She is shortest on LOD, has the lowest ballast and the highest D/L (with by far the shortest waterline), and ties for lowest displacement. Nevertheless the accommodations, while not spacious, are cleverly arranged to include a dinette, complete with table and facing seats. A galley slides forward from under the cockpit when needed. Worst features: The forward V-berth does not provide adequate room for two adults to share."

See also
List of sailing boat types

Similar sailboats
Buccaneer 220
Cal 20
Core Sound 20 Mark 3
Flicka 20
Halman 20
Mistral T-21
Nordica 16
Paceship 20
San Juan 21
Sirius 22

References

External links
Official brochure

Keelboats
1980s sailboat type designs
Sailing yachts
Trailer sailers
Sailboat type designs by Cortland Steck
Sailboat types built by Hunter Marine